Trimethyltrienolone (TMT), also known by its developmental code name R-2956 or RU-2956, is an antiandrogen medication which was never introduced for medical use but has been used in scientific research.

Side effects
Due to its close relation to metribolone (methyltrienolone), it is thought that TMT may produce hepatotoxicity.

Pharmacology

Pharmacodynamics
TMT is a selective and highly potent competitive antagonist of the androgen receptor (AR) with very low intrinsic/partial androgenic activity and no estrogenic, antiestrogenic, progestogenic, or antimineralocorticoid activity. The drug is a derivative of the extremely potent androgen/anabolic steroid metribolone (R-1881; 17α-methyltrenbolone), and has been reported to possess only about 4-fold lower affinity for the AR in comparison. In accordance, it has relatively high affinity for the AR among steroidal antiandrogens, and almost completely inhibits dihydrotestosterone (DHT) binding to the AR in vitro at a mere 10-fold molar excess. The AR weak partial agonistic activity of TMT is comparable to that of cyproterone acetate.

Chemistry

TMT, also known as 2α,2β,17α-trimethyltrienolone or as δ9,11-2α,2β,17α-trimethyl-19-nortestosterone, as well as 2α,2β,17α-trimethylestra-4,9,11-trien-17β-ol-3-one, is a synthetic estrane steroid and a derivative of testosterone and 19-nortestosterone. It is the 2α,2β,17α-trimethyl derivative of trenbolone (trienolone) and the 2α,2β-dimethyl derivative of metribolone (methyltrienolone), both of which are synthetic androgens/anabolic steroids.

History
TMT was developed by Roussel Uclaf in France and was first known as early as 1969. It was one of the earliest antiandrogens to be discovered and developed, along with others such as benorterone, BOMT, cyproterone, and cyproterone acetate. The drug was under investigation by Roussel Uclaf for potential medical use, but was abandoned in favor of nonsteroidal antiandrogens like flutamide and nilutamide due to their comparative advantage of a complete lack of androgenicity. Roussel Uclaf subsequently developed and introduced nilutamide for medical use.

References

Abandoned drugs
Tertiary alcohols
Estranes
Hepatotoxins
Ketones
Steroidal antiandrogens